Women's studies is an academic field that draws on feminist and interdisciplinary methods to place women's lives and experiences at the center of study, while examining social and cultural constructs of gender; systems of privilege and oppression; and the relationships between power and gender as they intersect with other identities and social locations such as race, sexual orientation, socio-economic class, and disability.

Popular concepts that are related to the field of women's studies include feminist theory, standpoint theory, intersectionality, multiculturalism, transnational feminism, social justice, affect studies, agency, bio-politics, materialism, and embodiment. Research practices and methodologies associated with women's studies include ethnography, autoethnography, focus groups, surveys, community-based research, discourse analysis, and reading practices associated with critical theory, post-structuralism, and queer theory. The field researches and critiques different societal norms of gender, race, class, sexuality, and other social inequalities. 

Women's studies is related to the fields of gender studies, feminist studies, and sexuality studies, and more broadly related to the fields of cultural studies, ethnic studies, and African-American studies.

Women's studies courses are now offered in over seven hundred institutions in the United States, and globally in more than forty countries.

History

Australia 
In 1956, Australian feminist Madge Dawson took up a lectureship in the Department of Adult Education at Sydney University and began researching and teaching on the status of women. Dawson's course, "Women in a Changing World", which focused on the socio-economic and political status of women in western Europe, becoming one of the first women's studies courses.

Americas 
The first accredited women's studies course in the U.S was held in 1969 at Cornell University. After a year of intense organizing of women's consciousness raising groups, rallies, petition circulating, and operating unofficial or experimental classes and presentations before seven committees and assemblies, the first women's studies program in the United States was established in 1970 at San Diego State College (now San Diego State University). In conjunction with National Women's Liberation Movement, students and community members created the ad hoc committee for women's studies. The second women's studies program in the United States was established in 1971 at Wichita State University in Wichita, Kansas. It was mostly formed through many efforts by women in the English department, administration and within the community. By 1974, San Diego State University faculty members began a nationwide campaign for the integration of the department. At the time, these actions and the field were extremely political. Before formalized departments and programs, many women's studies courses were advertised unofficially around campuses and taught by women faculty member – without pay – in addition to their established teaching and administrative responsibilities. Then, as in many cases today, faculty who teach in women's studies often hold faculty appointments in other departments on campus.

The first scholarly journal in interdisciplinary women's studies, Feminist Studies, began publishing in 1972. The National Women's Studies Association (of the United States) was established in 1977.

In 1977, there were 276 women's studies programs nationwide in the United States. The number of programs increased in the following decade, growing up to 530 programs in 1989. Around the 1980s, universities in the U.S. saw the growth and development of women's studies courses and programs across the country while the field continued to grapple with backlash from both conservative groups and concerns from those within the women's movement about the white, existentialist, and heterosexual privilege of those in the academy. 

In Canada The first few university courses in Women's Studies were taught in the early 1970s. In 1984 the federal government established five regional endowed chairs in Women's Studies for each region of the country at: 
 Simon Fraser University (British Columbia),
  University of Winnipeg and University of Manitoba (Prairies, joint chair)
 Carleton University and the University of Ottawa (Ontario, joint chair), 
 Université de Laval (Quebec), and
 Mount St Vincent University (Atlantic Canada).

Around the same time, women academics in Latin America began to form women's studies groups. The first chair of women's studies in Mexico was created in the political and social sciences faculty of the National Autonomous University of Mexico in 1970. Starting in 1979, the Grupo Autónomo de Mujeres Universitarias (GAMU, Autonomous Group of University Women), which included both Mexican faculty and students began meeting periodically to discuss how feminism could be introduced to various campuses across the country. In 1982, a women's studies program was created at the Universidad Autónoma Metropolitana-Xochimilco. Similarly in 1983, activists in the Mexican feminist movement, including , Flora Botton, and Elena Urrutia, founded the Programa Interdisciplinario de Estudios de la Mujer (PIEG, Interdisciplinary Women's Studies Program) at El Colegio de México in Mexico City. In 1984, academics formed the Centro de Estudios de la Mujer (Center for Women's Studies) in the psychology faculty at the National Autonomous University of Mexico. The field was formalized with the creation of the Programa Universitario de Estudios de Género (PUEG, University Program on Gender Studies) in 1992, at the urging of academics like Gloria Careaga, Araceli Mingo, Lorenia Parada, and Alicia Elena Pérez Duarte.

Activists and researchers in Chile began meeting in 1978 with creation of the Círculo de la Mujer (Women's Circle). In 1984, they founded the Centro de Estudios de la Mujer (CEM, Center for Women's Studies) in Santiago to facilitate multi-disciplinary studies on women and gender. From the early 1980s, women like Juanita Barreto Gama, Guiomar Dueñas Vargas, Florence Thomas, Magdalena León Gómez, María Martínez, Donny Meertens, María Himelda Ramírez and Ana Rico de Alonso worked to create an interdisciplinary field of feminist study in Colombia. First they met informally, then were able to gain official recognition in 1985 as the Grupo de Estudios Mujer y Sociedad (Women & Society Study Group) and finally in 1994, they launched the Programa de Estudios de Género, Mujer y Desarrollo (PGMD, Gender, Women and Development Studies Program) in the Human Sciences Department at the National University of Colombia. 

In 1985, activists in Argentina launched the "Introduction to Women's Studies" and a post-graduate seminar, "La construcción social del género sexual" (The Social Construction of Sexual Gender) at the University of Buenos Aires. In 1987, María Fernández became the chair of UBA's degree program in women's studies. In 1992, the Area Interdisciplinaria de Estudios de la Mujer (AIEM, Interdisciplinary Area of ​​Women's Studies), which became the Instituto Interdisciplinario de Estudios de Género (Interdisciplinary Institute of Gender Studies) in 1997, was founded at UBA linking academics from the faculties of Arts, Anthropology, Classics and Letters, Education, History, Languages, and Philosophy to encourage broader research and analysis of women in these fields. Gender studies also began to be established in universities in Brazil in the 1980s and continued expanding throughout the 1990s. 

The political aims of the feminist movement that compelled the formation of women's studies found itself at odds with the institutionalized academic feminism of the 1990s. As "woman" as a concept continued to be expanded, the exploration of social constructions of gender led to the field's expansion into both gender studies and sexuality studies. The field of women's studies continued to grow during the 1990s and into the 2000s with the expansion of universities offering majors, minors, and certificates in women's studies, gender studies, and feminist studies. The first official PhD program in Women's Studies was established at Emory University in 1990. As of 2012, there were 16 institutions offering a PhD in Women's Studies in the United States. Since then, UC Santa Cruz (2013), the University of Kentucky-Lexington (2013), Stony Brook University (2014), and Oregon State University (2016) also introduced a PhD in the field.

Europe 
Elizabeth Bird traced the development of Women's Studies in the UK out of informal education run by the women's liberation movement (WLM), the Workers' Educational Association, "CR" or "consciousness raising" groups, left-wing activist groups, and extramural departments attached to universities and colleges. Bird notes that, according to feminist activists and scholars Anna Coote and Beatrix Campbell who interviewed many participants in the 1960s-70s development of women's studies, "in the summer of 1969 Juliet Mitchell taught a short course entitled ‘The Role of Women in Society’ in the ‘Anti University’, which had been organised by radical academics as part of the student protest movement". Maggie Humm identifies this summer course as "Britain’s first women’s studies course".

In 1975, Margarita Rendel, Oonagh Hartnett, Zoe Fairbairns, wrote a guide outlining the 17 then-existing undergraduate courses, 1 postgraduate option, four college of education offers and six polytechnics courses in Women's Studies – often called 'women in society' – in the United Kingdom. They compiled the guide from surveys of UK universities and adding to research previously published by Sue Beardon and Erika Stevenson for the National Union of Students in 1974.

A part time postgraduate Diploma in Women's Studies was offered by The Polytechnic of Central London from 1977, and in 1978 an MA course on the subject of 'Rights', including women's rights, was organised by Margarita Rendel at the London Institute of Education.

In 1980, the University of Kent launched the first named MA degree in Women's Studies, with Mary Evans leading the development of the course. Following Kent, Bradford (1982), Sheffield City Polytechnic (1983), Warwick (1983) and York (1984) opened MA courses. In 1990, part-time BAs in Women's Studies launched at the Polytechnic of North East London and at Preston Polytechnic. Veronica Beechey was recruited by the Open University in 1983 to initiate a women's studies course there.

Current courses in Women's Studies in the United Kingdom can be found through the Universities and Colleges Admissions Service.

Central Asia 
In 2015 at Kabul University the first master's degree course in gender and women's studies in Afghanistan began.

Theoretical traditions and research methods 

Early women's studies courses and curricula were often driven by the question "Why are women not included? Where are the women?". That is, as more women became more present in higher education as both students and faculty, questions arose about the male-centric nature of most courses and curricula. Women faculty in traditional departments such as history, English, and philosophy began to offer courses with a focus on women. Drawing from the women's movement's notion that "the personal is political", courses also began to develop around sexual politics, women's roles in society, and the ways in which women's personal lives reflect larger power structures.

Since the 1970s, scholars of women's studies have taken post-modern approaches to understand gender and its intersections with race, class, ethnicity, sexuality, religion, age, and (dis)ability to produce and maintain power structures within society. With this turn, there has been a focus on language, subjectivity, and social hegemony, and how the lives of subjects, however they identify, are constituted. At the core of these theories is the notion that however one identifies, gender, sex, and sexuality are not intrinsic, but are socially constructed.

Major theories employed in women's studies courses include feminist theory, intersectionality, standpoint theory, transnational feminism, and social justice. Research practices associated with women's studies place women and the experiences of women at the center of inquiry through the use of quantitative, qualitative, and mixed methods. Feminist researchers acknowledge their role in the production of knowledge and make explicit the relationship between the researcher and the research subject.

Feminist theory 

Feminist theory refers to the body of writing that works to address gender discrimination and disparities, while acknowledging, describing, and analyzing the experiences and conditions of women's lives. Theorists and writers such as bell hooks, Simone de Beauvoir, Patricia Hill Collins, and Alice Walker added to the field of feminist theory with respect to the ways in which race and gender mutually inform the experiences of women of color with works such as Feminist Theory: From Margin to Center (hooks), In Search of Our Mothers' Gardens (Walker), and Black Feminist Thought: Knowledge, Consciousness, and the Politics of Empowerment (Collins). Alice Walker coined the term womanism to situate black women's experiences as they struggle for social change and liberation, while simultaneously celebrating the strength of black women, their culture, and their beauty. Patricia Hill Collin's contributed the concept of the "matrix of domination" to feminist theory, which reconceptualized race, class, and gender as interlocking systems of oppression that shape experiences of privilege and oppression.

Intersectionality 

Intersectionality is a way of understanding and analyzing the complexity in people, human experiences, and society. Associated with the third wave of feminism, Kimberlé Crenshaw's theory of intersectionality has become the key theoretical framework through which various feminist scholars discuss the relationship of between one's social and political identities such as gender, race, age, and sexual orientation, and received societal discrimination. Intersectionality posits that these relationships must be considered to understand hierarchies of power and privilege, as well as the effects in which they manifest in an individual's life. Though events and conditions of social and political life are often thought to be shaped by one factor, intersectionality theorizes that oppression and social inequality are a result of how powerful individuals view the combination of various factors; emphasizing that discrimination is accounted for by power, not personal identity.

Standpoint theory 

Standpoint theory, also classified as feminist standpoint theory, developed in the 1980s as a way of critically examining the production of knowledge and its resulting effects on practices of power. Standpoint theory operates from the idea that knowledge is socially situated and underrepresented groups and minorities have historically been ignored or marginalized when it comes to the production of knowledge. Emerging from Marxist thought, standpoint theory argues for analysis that challenges the authority of political and social "truths". Standpoint theory, assumes that power lies solely within the hands of the male gender as the process of decision making in society is constructed exclusively for, and by men. An example of where standpoint theory presents itself in society is through the processes of political analysis, as this field of study is almost entirely controlled by men. Furthermore, from a Marxist viewpoint, Karl Marx had expressed a notion in which believed that those in power have the inability to understand the perspectives of those whom they hold power. Providing that standpoint theory acknowledges the male incapability of understanding the oppression in which women face in society.

Transnational feminist theory 

Transnational feminism is concerned with the flow of social, political, and economic equality of women and men across borders; directly in response to globalization, neoliberalism, and imperialism. Women's studies began incorporating transnational feminist theory into its curricula as a way to disrupt and challenge the ways in which knowledge regarding gender is prioritized, transmitted, and circulated in the field and academy. Transnational feminist theory is continually challenging the traditional divides of society, in which are crucial to ongoing politics and cultural beliefs. A key recognition advanced from the transnational feminist perspective is that gender is, has been, and will continue to be, a global effort. Furthermore, a transnational feminist perspective perpetuates that a lack of attention to the cultural and economic injustices of gender, as a result of globalization, may aid in the reinforcing of global gender inequalities; though, this can only come about when one occupies globally privileged subject positions.

Social justice 

Since its inception and connection with the women's movement, activism has been a foundation of women's studies. Increasingly social justice has become a key component of women's studies courses, programs, and departments. Social justice theory is concerned with the fight for just communities, not on the individual level, but for the whole of society. Women's studies students engage in social justice projects, although some scholars and critics are concerned about requiring students to engage in both mandated activism and/or social justice work. Women's studies not only focus on concepts such as domestic violence, discrimination in the workplace, and gender differences in the division of labor at home, but gives a foundation for understanding the root cause of these concepts, which is the first step to making for a better life for women.

Agency 
Agency may be defined as the capability to make choices individually and freely. An individual's agency may be restricted due to various social factors, such as gender, race, religion and social class. From a feminist standpoint, agency may be viewed as an attempt to equalize the one-sided oppression that has characterized first wave feminism. Feminists use agency in attempt to create new forms of autonomy and dependence from the reshaping of gender relations that is taking place in global society. Women's studies acknowledges the lack of agency in which women historically possessed, due to hierarchical positions in society. Feminists are actively making an effort to increase gender equality, as it may result in expanding social agency for all women.

Materialism 
Materialist theory derives from 1960's and 1970's social work in feminism. Materialism possesses significant ties to the Marxist theories of history, agency, and ideology; though, may be distinguished through the incorporation of language and culture to its philosophy. Materialism poses questions to both social analytics and social relations, in which may be found in the material conditions of any given society. In addition from examining from a gender standpoint, material conditions are studied in relation to realistic aspects of women's lives. A key aspect in which materialist feminists have revealed these relations is from the feminist perspective, claiming that social conditions of gender are historically situated, as well as subjected to intervention and change. Materialist feminism specifically focuses on social arrangements that accentuate the role of women—notably the aspects of family, domesticity, and motherhood. Materialism analyzes gendering discourses in which promote women's marginalization; Thus, one of the most influential aspects of materialist feminism is its attentiveness with questions of ideology and how they relate to history and agency.

Pedagogies 
In most institutions, women's studies courses employ feminist pedagogy in a triad model of equal parts research, theory, and praxis. The decentralization of the professor as the source of knowledge is often fundamental to women's studies classroom culture. Students are encouraged to take an active role in "claiming" their education, taking responsibility for themselves and the learning process. Women's studies programs and courses are designed to explore the intersectionality of gender, race, sexuality, class and other topics that are involved in identity politics and societal norms through a feminist lens. Women's studies courses focus on a variety of topics such as media literacy, sexuality, race and ethnicity, history involving women, queer theory, multiculturalism and other courses closely related. Faculty incorporate these components into classes across a variety of topics, including popular culture, women in the economy, reproductive and environmental justice, and women's health across the lifespan.

Women's studies programs are involved in social justice work and often design curricula that are embedded with theory and activism outside of the classroom setting. Some women's studies programs offer internships that are community-based allowing students the opportunity to experience how institutional structures of privilege and oppression directly affects women's lives. Women's studies curricula often encourage students to participate in service-learning activities in addition to discussion and reflection upon course materials. However, Daphne Patai, from the University of Massachusetts Amherst, has criticized this aspect of women's studies programs, arguing that they place politics over education, stating "the strategies of faculty members in these programs have included policing insensitive language, championing research methods deemed congenial to women (such as qualitative over quantitative methods), and conducting classes as if they were therapy sessions." Since women's studies students analyze identity markers including gender, race, class, and sexuality, this often results in dissecting institutionalized structures of power. As a result of these pedagogies, women's studies students leave university with a tool set to make social change and do something about power inequalities in society.

Notable women's studies scholars include Charlotte Bunch, Patricia Hill Collins, bell hooks, Angela Davis, Cherríe Moraga, Audre Lorde, Adrienne Rich, and Barbara Ransby.

Internal Academic Criticism 
In the book "Professing Feminism: Education and Indoctrination in Women's Studies" thirty Women's Studies academics came together to criticise the "unhealthy conditions and self-destructive tendencies that appear to be intrinsic to many Women's Studies programs". Professors spoke of being unable to "discuss their concerns about this belligerent anti-intellectualism with other faculty members in Women's Studies", with claims of a "constant emphasis on political purity.... from both students and professors".

See also 
 Feminist economics
 Feminist Formations 
 Feminist Review
 Feminist Studies
 Feminist theory
 French feminism
 Gender studies
 Girl studies
 List of women's studies journals
 Men's studies
 Misandry
 Separatist feminism
 Signs: Journal of Women in Culture and Society
 Social criticism
 Social justice warrior
 Women artists
 Women's history
 World Center for Women's Archives

Notes

References
 Borland, K. (1991). That's not what I said: Interpretive conflict in oral narrative research. In Giuck, S. & Patai, D. (Eds.), Women's Words: The Feminist Practice of Oral History (pp. 63–76). NY:  Routledge
 Brooks, A. (2007). Feminist standpoint epistemology: Building knowledge and empowerment through women's lived experiences. In Hesse-Biber, S.N. & Leavy, P.L. (Eds.), Feminist Research Practice (pp. 53–82). CA: Sage Publications.
 Brooks, A. & Hesse-Biber, S.N. (2007). An invitation to feminist research. In Hesse-Biber, S.N. & Leavy, P.L. (Eds.), Feminist Research Practice (pp. 1–24). CA: Sage Publications.
 Buch, E.D. & Staller, K.M. (2007). The feminist practice of ethnography. In Hesse-Biber, S.N. & Leavy, P.L. (Eds.), Feminist Research Practice (pp. 187–221). CA: Sage Publications.
 Dill, T.B & Zambrana, R. (2009) Emerging Intersections: Race, Class and Gender in Theory, Policy and Practice. NJ: Rutgers University Press.
 Fausto-Sterling, Anne (2000). Sexing the body: gender politics and the construction of sexuality. New York: Basic Books. .
 Halse, C. & Honey, A. (2005). Unraveling ethics: Illuminating the moral dilemmas of research ethics. Journal of Women in Culture and Society, 30 (4), 2141–2162.
 Harding, S. (1987). Introduction: Is there a feminist method? In Harding, S. (ed.), Feminism & Methodology. (pp. 1–14). IN: Indiana University Press.
 Hesse-Biber, S.N. (2007). The practice of feminist in-depth interviewing. In Hesse-Biber, S.N. & Leavy, P.L. (Eds.), Feminist Research Practice (pp. 111–148). CA: Sage Publications.
 Hyam, M. (2004). Hearing girls' silences: Thoughts on the politics and practices of a feminist method of group discussion. Gender, Place, and Culture, 11 (1), 105–119.
 Leavy, P.L. (2007a). Feminist postmodernism and poststructuralism. In Hesse-Biber, S.N. & Leavy, P.L. (Eds.), Feminist Research Practice (pp. 83–108). CA: Sage Publications.
 Leavy, P.L. (2007b). The practice of feminist oral history and focus group interviews. In Hesse-Biber, S.N. & Leavy, P.L. (Eds.), Feminist Research Practice (pp. 149–186). CA: Sage Publications.
 Leavy, P.L. (2007c). The feminist practice of content analysis. In Hesse-Biber, S.N. & Leavy, P.L. (Eds.), Feminist Research Practice (pp. 223–248). CA: Sage Publications.
 Leckenby, D. (2007). Feminist empiricism: Challenging gender bias and “setting the record straight.” In Hesse-Biber, S.N. & Leavy, P.L. (Eds.), Feminist Research Practice (pp. 27–52). CA: Sage Publications.
 Lykes, M.B. & Coquillon, E. (2006). Participatory and Action Research and feminisms: Towards Transformative Praxis. In Sharlene Hesse-Biber (Ed.). Handbook of Feminist Research: Theory and Praxis. CA: Sage Publications.
 Miner-Rubino, K. & Jayaratne, T.E. (2007). Feminist survey research. In Hesse-Biber, S.N. & Leavy, P.L. (Eds.), Feminist Research Practice (pp. 293–325). CA: Sage Publications.

Further reading 
 Berkin, Carol R., Judith L. Pinch, and Carole S. Appel, Exploring Women's Studies: Looking Forward, Looking Back, 2005,  
 
 
 
Davis, Angela Y. (2003). Are Prisons Obsolete?, Open Media (April 2003), 
 
Fausto-Sterling, Anne (1992). Myths of gender: biological theories about women and men. New York: BasicBooks. .
Fausto-Sterling, Anne (2000). Sexing the body: gender politics and the construction of sexuality. New York: Basic Books. .
 Fausto-Sterling, Anne (2012). Sex/Gender: Biology in a Social World. New York: Routledge. .
 
 Grewal, Inderpal and Caren Kaplan, An Introduction to Women's Studies: Gender in a Transnational World, 2006,  
 
 Ginsberg, Alice E. The Evolution of American Women's Studies: Reflections on Triumphs, Controversies and Change (Palgrave Macmillan: 2009).  Online interview with Ginsberg
 Griffin, Gabriele and Rosi Braidotti (eds.), Thinking Differently : A Reader in European Women's Studies, London etc. : Zed Books, 2002  
 Howe, Florence (ed.), The Politics of Women's Studies: Testimony from Thirty Founding Mothers, Paperback edition, New York:  Feminist Press 2001,  
 
 
 
 
 
 Lederman, Muriel, and Ingrid Bartsch, eds. The Gender and Science Reader. New York: Routledge, 2001. Print.
 
 
 
 Messer-Davidow, Ellen, Disciplining Feminism: From Social Activism to Academic Discourse, Durham, NC etc.: Duke University Press, 2002  
 Narayan, Uma. Dislocating Cultures: Identities, Traditions, and Third-World Feminism. Routledge, 1997. ISBN 9780415914192
 Orr, Catherine; Braithwaite, Ann; Lichtenstein, Diane (2012). Rethinking Women's and Gender Studies. New York: Routledge. 
 
 
 
 
 Schiebinger, Londa. Has Feminism Changed Science?. Cambridge: Harvard University Press, 1999. Print. 
 Ruth, Sheila, Issues In Feminism: An Introduction to Women's Studies, 2000,  
 
 
 Wiegman, Robyn (editor), Women's Studies on Its Own: A Next Wave Reader in Institutional Change, Duke University Press, 2002.

External links 

 Smith College List of Graduate Programs in Women's Studies and Gender Studies
 WSSLinks: women's studies web links from the University of Toronto
 Women's Studies web resources
 Center for Women's Studies of Tehran University, Iran
 The Gay, Lesbian, Bisexual, Transgender Historical Society
 Karen Lerhman, Off Course, Mother Jones, September 1993
 Main focus "Frauen- und Geschlechtergeschichte in Westfalen"
 List of Women's Studies Programs around the World
 List of Women's Studies Programs in the United States
 Women's Studies Resources from WIDNET: Women in Development Network
Archival papers of Kay Armatage (key founder of the Institute for Women's and Gender Studies at the University of Toronto) held at the University of Toronto Archives and Record Management Services